Lombardy renewed its delegation to the Italian Senate on March 27, 1994. This election was a part of national Italian general election of 1994 even if, according to the Italian Constitution, every senatorial challenge in each Region is a single and independent race.

The election was won by the new Silvio Berlusconi's centre-right coalition called Pole of Freedoms, which obtained a local landslide victory electing all its candidates.

Background
This election was the first one of the so-called Second Republic. If Italy had the strongest political stability in the previous 50 years, in twelve months it probably suffered the deepest democratic change ever in Western Europe. All the parties that ruled the country in the second half of the 20th century collapsed, under the political attack of the Northern League and the judiciary scandal of Mani pulite. After the electoral reform from the proportional representation to a prevalent FPTP system, the political spectrum was reorganized in three poles: the leftist Alliance of Progressives, the centrist Pact for Italy and the centre-rightist Pole of Freedoms. This latter was an alliance between the League and new liberal party Forza Italia of television entrepreneur and A.C. Milan President Silvio Berlusconi.

Berlusconi attacked the Progressives calling them a "communist" alliance, effectively subtracting quite all the former Socialist votes even if the Italian Socialist Party (PSI) was a member of that alliance: the PSI was consequently disbanded after 100 years of history, and the Alliance had little more than the traditional support of the former Italian Communist Party, then Democratic Party of the Left. Obtaining also more moderate votes than Christian Democracy's heir, the Italian People's Party (Pact), Berlusconi ensured the victory of his coalition, that in Lombardy resulted very profitable to the League, which obtained the absolute majority of the senators.

Electoral system
The intricate electoral system introduced in 1993, called Mattarella Law, provided 75% of the seats in the Senate as elected by first-past-the-post system, whereas the remaining 25% was assigned by a special proportional method that actually assigned the remaining seats to minority parties.

Redistricting
The new electoral law imposed the revision of the outdated design of the constituencies of 1948. After quite a half century, the agricultural south had lost population to the industrial Milan metropolitan area. The Province of Cremona and the Province of Pavia lost a seat, while new constituencies were added in the western and northern Milanese hinterland. The number of constituencies rose from 31 to 35.

Results

|-
|- bgcolor="#E9E9E9"
!rowspan="1" align="left" valign="top"|Coalition
!rowspan="1" align="center" valign="top"|votes
!rowspan="1" align="center" valign="top"|votes (%)
!rowspan="1" align="center" valign="top"|seats
!rowspan="1" align="left" valign="top"|Party
!rowspan="1" align="center" valign="top"|seats
!rowspan="1" align="center" valign="top"|change
|-
!rowspan="3" align="left" valign="top"|Pole of Freedoms
|rowspan="3" valign="top"|2,491,623
|rowspan="3" valign="top"|43.6
|rowspan="3" valign="top"|35

|align="left"|Northern League
|valign="top"|26
|valign="top"|15
|-
|align="left"|Forza Italia
|valign="top"|8
|valign="top"|7
|-
|align="left"|Christian Democratic Centre
|valign="top"|1
|valign="top"|1
|-
!rowspan="3" align="left" valign="top"|The Progressives
|rowspan="3" valign="top"|1,291,179
|rowspan="3" valign="top"|22.6
|rowspan="3" valign="top"|6

|align="left"|Democratic Party of the Left
|valign="top"|3
|valign="top"|4
|-
|align="left"|Communist Refoundation Party
|valign="top"|2
|valign="top"|1
|-
|align="left"|Democratic Alliance
|valign="top"|1
|valign="top"|=

|-
!rowspan="1" align="left" valign="top"|Pact for Italy
|rowspan="1" valign="top"|837,082
|rowspan="1" valign="top"|14.7
|rowspan="1" valign="top"|3

|align="left"|Italy People's Party
|valign="top"|3
|valign="top"|9

|-
!rowspan="1" align="left" valign="top"|National Alliance
|rowspan="1" valign="top"|380,051
|rowspan="1" valign="top"|6.6
|rowspan="1" valign="top"|1

|align="left"|National Alliance
|valign="top"|1
|valign="top"|=

|-
!rowspan="1" align="left" valign="top"|Lombard Alpine League
|rowspan="1" valign="top"|246,046
|rowspan="1" valign="top"|4.3
|rowspan="1" valign="top"|1

|align="left"|Lombard Alpine League
|valign="top"|1
|valign="top"|=

|-
!rowspan="1" align="left" valign="top"|Pannella List
|rowspan="1" valign="top"|217,955
|rowspan="1" valign="top"|3.8
|rowspan="1" valign="top"|1

|align="left"|Forza Italia
|valign="top"|1
|valign="top"|1

|-
!rowspan="1" align="left" valign="top"|Others
|rowspan="1" valign="top"|245,872
|rowspan="1" valign="top"|4.3
|rowspan="1" valign="top"|-

|align="left"|Others
|valign="top"|-
|valign="top"|9

|- bgcolor="#E9E9E9"
!rowspan="1" align="left" valign="top"|Total coalitions
!rowspan="1" align="right" valign="top"|5,709,808
!rowspan="1" align="right" valign="top"|100.0
!rowspan="1" align="right" valign="top"|47
!rowspan="1" align="left" valign="top"|Total parties
!rowspan="1" align="right" valign="top"|47
!rowspan="1" align="right" valign="top"|1
|}
Sources: Ministry of the Interior, Italian Senate

Constituencies

|-
|- bgcolor="#E9E9E9"
!align="left" valign="top"|N°
!align="center" valign="top"|Constituency
!align="center" valign="top"|Winner
!align="center" valign="top"|Alliance
!align="center" valign="top"|Party
!align="center" valign="top"|Votes %
!align="center" valign="top"|Others
|-
|align="left"|1
|align="left"|Milan Central
|align="left"|Marisa Bedoni
|align="center"|Pole of Freedoms
|align="left"|Northern League
|align="left"|43.8%
|align="left"|R. De Corato (AN) 10.5%  F. Scopelliti (Pann.) 5.1%
|-
|align="left"|2
|align="left"|Milan East
|align="left"|Giancarlo Pagliarini
|align="center"|Pole of Freedoms
|align="left"|Northern League
|align="left"|45.5%
|align="left"|
|-
|align="left"|3
|align="left"|Milan West
|align="left"|Carlo Scognamiglio
|align="center"|Pole of Freedoms
|align="left"|Forza Italia
|align="left"|47.3%
|align="left"|
|-
|align="left"|4
|align="left"|Milan South
|align="left"|Roberto Lasagna
|align="center"|Pole of Freedoms
|align="left"|Forza Italia
|align="left"|43.2%
|align="left"|
|-
|align="left"|5
|align="left"|Milan North
|align="left"|Maurilio Frigerio
|align="center"|Pole of Freedoms
|align="left"|Northern League
|align="left"|41.2%
|align="left"|P. Giurickovic (Progr.) 30.9%
|-
|align="left"|6
|align="left"|Milan Sesto SG
|align="left"|Celestino Pedrazzini
|align="center"|Pole of Freedoms
|align="left"|Northern League
|align="left"|42.7%
|align="left"|A. Crippa (Progr.) 31.6%
|-
|align="left"|7
|align="left"|Lodi
|align="left"|Michele Bucci
|align="center"|Pole of Freedoms
|align="left"|Forza Italia
|align="left"|40.4%
|align="left"|
|-
|align="left"|8
|align="left"|Rozzano
|align="left"|Gianluigi Lombardi
|align="center"|Pole of Freedoms
|align="left"|Northern League
|align="left"|40.8%
|align="left"|C. Smuraglia (Progr.) 31.6%
|-
|align="left"|9
|align="left"|Abbiategrasso
|align="left"|Ivaldo Carini
|align="center"|Pole of Freedoms
|align="left"|Northern League
|align="left"|45.4%
|align="left"|
|-
|align="left"|10
|align="left"|Rho
|align="left"|Gianluigi Carnovali
|align="center"|Pole of Freedoms
|align="left"|Northern League
|align="left"|44.7%
|align="left"|
|-
|align="left"|11
|align="left"|Bollate
|align="left"|Erminio Busnelli
|align="center"|Pole of Freedoms
|align="left"|Northern League
|align="left"|44.0%
|align="left"|
|-
|align="left"|12
|align="left"|Cinisello Balsamo
|align="left"|Domenico Contestabile
|align="center"| Pole of Freedoms
|align="left"|Forza Italia
|align="left"|39.8%
|align="left"|C. Stajano (Progr.) 32.3%
|-
|align="left"|13
|align="left"|Seregno
|align="left"|Roberto Radice
|align="center"|Pole of Freedoms
|align="left"|Forza Italia
|align="left"|48.2%
|align="left"|
|-
|align="left"|14
|align="left"|Monza
|align="left"|Giorgio Brambilla
|align="center"|Pole of Freedoms
|align="left"|Northern League
|align="left"|43.5%
|align="left"|
|-
|align="left"|15
|align="left"|Melzo
|align="left"|Marcello Staglieno
|align="center"| Pole of Freedoms
|align="left"|Northern League
|align="left"|39.8%
|align="left"|
|-
|align="left"|16
|align="left"|Cologno Monzese
|align="left"|Corinto Marchini
|align="center"|Pole of Freedoms
|align="left"|Northern League
|align="left"|42.4%
|align="left"|
|-
|align="left"|17
|align="left"|Varese
|align="left"|Giovanni Binaghi
|align="center"|Pole of Freedoms
|align="left"|Northern League
|align="left"|50.7%
|align="left"|
|-
|align="left"|18
|align="left"|Gallarate
|align="left"|Luigi Peruzzotti
|align="center"|Pole of Freedoms
|align="left"|Northern League
|align="left"|51.6%
|align="left"|
|-
|align="left"|19
|align="left"|Busto Arsizio
|align="left"|Francesco Speroni
|align="center"|Pole of Freedoms
|align="left"|Northern League
|align="left"|53.0%
|align="left"|
|-
|align="left"|20
|align="left"|Como
|align="left"|Gianfranco Miglio
|align="center"|Pole of Freedoms
|align="left"|Northern League
|align="left"|47.9%
|align="left"|
|-
|align="left"|21
|align="left"|Cantù
|align="left"|Elia Manara
|align="center"|Pole of Freedoms
|align="left"|Northern League
|align="left"|47.1%
|align="left"|
|-
|align="left"|22
|align="left"|Brescia
|align="left"|Francesco Tabladini
|align="center"|Pole of Freedoms
|align="left"|Northern League
|align="left"|37.1%
|align="left"|
|-
|align="left"|23
|align="left"|Lumezzane
|align="left"|Luciano Garatti
|align="center"|Pole of Freedoms
|align="left"|Forza Italia
|align="left"|41.6%
|align="left"|A. Gregorelli (Pact) 20.1%
|-
|align="left"|24
|align="left"|Desenzano del Garda
|align="left"|Massimo Wilde
|align="center"|Pole of Freedoms
|align="left"|Northern League
|align="left"|40.4%
|align="left"|
|-
|align="left"|25
|align="left"|Chiari
|align="left"|Giovanni Gei
|align="center"|Pole of Freedoms
|align="left"|Christian Democratic Centre
|align="left"|41.8%
|align="left"|F. Ferrari (Pact) 22.7%
|-
|align="left"|26
|align="left"|Suzzara
|align="left"|Giovanni Robusti
|align="center"|Pole of Freedoms
|align="left"|Northern League
|align="left"|34.5%
|align="left"|P. Bergonzi (Progr.) 31.7%
|-
|align="left"|27
|align="left"|Mantua
|align="left"|Paolo Gibertoni
|align="center"| Pole of Freedoms
|align="left"|Northern League
|align="left"|35.3%
|align="left"|R. Borroni (Progr.) 33.2%
|-
|align="left"|28
|align="left"|Cremona
|align="left"|Italico Maffini
|align="center"|Pole of Freedoms
|align="left"|Northern League
|align="left"|38.8%
|align="left"|
|-
|align="left"|29
|align="left"|Pavia
|align="left"|Giampiero Beccaria
|align="center"|Pole of Freedoms
|align="left"|Forza Italia
|align="left"|42.0%
|align="left"|
|-
|align="left"|30
|align="left"|Vigevano
|align="left"|Mario Masiero
|align="center"|Pole of Freedoms
|align="left"|Northern League
|align="left"|45.3%
|align="left"|
|-
|align="left"|31
|align="left"|Bergamo
|align="left"|Livio Caputo
|align="center"|Pole of Freedoms
|align="left"|Forza Italia
|align="left"|42.3%
|align="left"|
|-
|align="left"|32
|align="left"|Albino
|align="left"|Silvestro Terzi
|align="center"|Pole of Freedoms
|align="left"|Northern League
|align="left"|48.1%
|align="left"|V. Bonandrini (Pact) 21.1%E. De Paoli (LAL) 7.5%
|-
|align="left"|33
|align="left"|Treviglio
|align="left"|Massimo Dolazza
|align="center"|Pole of Freedoms
|align="left"|Northern League
|align="left"|43.6%
|align="left"|
|-
|align="left"|34
|align="left"|Sondrio
|align="left"|Giampaolo Paini
|align="center"|Pole of Freedoms
|align="left"|Northern League
|align="left"|48.6%
|align="left"|
|-
|align="left"|35
|align="left"|Lecco
|align="left"|Luigi Roveda
|align="center"|Pole of Freedoms
|align="left"|Northern League
|align="left"|43.2%
|align="left"|C. Secchi (Pact) 19.8%
|}

Additional senators
 The Progressives Roberto Borroni (Democratic Party of the Left, 33.2%)
 Corrado Stajano (Democratic Party of the Left, 32.3%)
 Piergiorgio Bergonzi (Communist Refoundation Party, 31.7%)
 Carlo Smuraglia (Democratic Party of the Left, 31.6%)
 Aurelio Crippa (Communist Refoundation Party, 31.6%)
 Pietro Giurickovic (Democratic Alliance, 30.9%)
 Pact for Italy Francesco Ferrari (Italian People's Party, 22.7%)
 Vincenzo Bonandrini (Italian People's Party, 21.1%), after his death in 1994 substituted by Carlo Secchi (Italian People's Party, 19.8%)
 Aldo Gregorelli (Italian People's Party, 20.1%)
 National Alliance Riccardo De Corato (National Alliance, 10.5%)
 Lombard Alpine League Elidio De Paoli (Lombard Alpine League, 7.5%)
 Pannella List'''
 Francesca Scopelliti (Pannella List–Forza Italia, 5.1%)

Notes

Elections in Lombardy
1994 elections in Italy